The 1956–57 İstanbul Football League season was the 47th season of the league. Fenerbahçe SK won the league for the 14th time.

Season

References

Istanbul Football League seasons
Turkey
1956–57 in Turkish football